This table shows the biggest manufacturers of cable in terms of revenue as of 2020. The revenues noted here are total revenue of the group as reported in financial statements. These may not represent the revenues from their cable business.

References

Electrical-engineering-related lists
Cable manufacturers